The American Institute of Electrical Engineers (AIEE) was a United States-based organization of electrical engineers that existed from 1884 through 1962. On January 1, 1963, it merged with the Institute of Radio Engineers (IRE) to form the Institute of Electrical and Electronics Engineers (IEEE).

History 

The 1884 founders of the American Institute of Electrical Engineers (AIEE) included some of the most prominent inventors and innovators in the then new field of electrical engineering, among them Nikola Tesla, Thomas Alva Edison, Elihu Thomson, Edwin J. Houston, and Edward Weston.  The purpose of the AIEE was stated  "to promote the Arts and Sciences connected with the production and utilization of electricity and the welfare of those employed in these Industries: by means of social intercourse, the reading and discussion of professional papers and the circulation by means of publication among members and associates of information thus obtained." The first president of AIEE was Norvin Green, president of the Western Union Telegraph Company.  Other notable AIEE presidents were Alexander Graham Bell (1891–1892), Charles Proteus Steinmetz (1901–1902), Bion J. Arnold (1903-1904),  Schuyler S. Wheeler (1905–1906), Dugald C. Jackson (1910–1911), Ralph D. Mershon (1912–1913), Michael I. Pupin (1925–1926), and Titus G. LeClair (1950–1951).

The first technical meeting of the AIEE was held during the International Electrical Exhibition of 1884, in Philadelphia, Pennsylvania (October 7–8, at the Franklin Institute).  After several years of operating primarily in New York City, the AIEE authorized local sections in 1902.  These were formed first in the United States (Chicago and Ithaca, 1902) and then in other countries (the first section outside the US being Toronto, Ontario, Canada, established in 1903).  The AIEE's regional structure was soon complemented by a technical structure –the first technical committee of AIEE (the High Voltage Transmission Committee) being formed in 1903.  Standardization work started in 1891 with the formation of a committee on units and standards, followed by a committee on standard wiring.

The formation of the AIEE Subcommittee on Large-Scale Computing in 1946 was considered a key milestone in the history of computer engineering.  It was the first time that a professional association recognized the significance of computers and computing in electro-technology.

The early technical areas of interest of AIEE were electric power, lighting, and wired communications.   Radio and wireless communications became the major focus of a rival organization, the Institute of Radio Engineers (the IRE, established 1912).   The dynamic growth of radio technology and the emergence of the new discipline of electronics in the 1940s led to stiff competition between AIEE and IRE, with IRE showing faster growth in the 1950s and early 1960s, and attracting more students. In 1957, the IRE, with approximately 55,500 members, surpassed the AIEE in membership size; by 1962 the IRE had 96,500 members to the AIEE's 57,000.

Institute's first logo 

After the AIEE's founding in 1884, its member's badge was created in 1893 by a committee headed by Dr. Alexander Graham Bell, President of AIEE from 1891 to 1892. The badge's logo depicted Benjamin Franklin's kite, representative of the discovery that lightning carried electricity. The design also showed a winding of gold wire with its midpoints crossed by a galvanometer's indicator, invoking the electrical engineer's Wheatstone bridge. Additionally, Ohm's law and the letters 'AIEE' were added in gold at the logo's base. The busy logo design was replaced four years later.

Merger and evolution 

The AIEE and the IRE merged in 1963 to form the Institute of Electrical and Electronics Engineers (IEEE), in short order becoming the world's largest technical society.

See also 

 Institute of Electrical and Electronics Engineers (IEEE)
 Institute of Radio Engineers (IRE)

References 
Notes

Bibliography
 IEEE, Newlife International website.

External links

American engineering organizations
Electrical engineering organizations
Organizations established in 1884